The 2015 GoDaddy Bowl was a  post-season American college football bowl game played on December 23, 2015, at Ladd–Peebles Stadium in Mobile, Alabama.  The 17th edition of the GoDaddy Bowl featured the Bowling Green Falcons of the Mid-American Conference against the Georgia Southern Eagles of the Sun Belt Conference. Kickoff was at 7:00 p.m. CST and aired on ESPN. It was one of the 2015–16 bowl games that concludes the 2015 FBS football season. The game was sponsored by Internet domain registrar and web hosting company GoDaddy.

Teams
The game's match up consisted of Bowling Green Falcons against the Georgia Southern Eagles.

Georgia Southern Eagles

This was the first bowl game in school history for Georgia Southern, in their second season as a member of the Football Bowl Subdivision and the Sun Belt Conference and their first season of bowl eligibility.

Bowling Green Falcons

Game summary

Scoring Summary

Source:

Statistics

Officials

References

External links
 ESPN summary

2015–16 NCAA football bowl games
LendingTree Bowl
Bowling Green Falcons football bowl games
Georgia Southern Eagles football bowl games
GoDaddy Bowl (December)
GoDaddy Bowl